Jan Štohanzl (born 20 March 1985) is a Czech football midfielder who plays for SK Aritma Prague.

Career
In 2019, Štohanzl joined SK Aritma Prague.

References

External links
 
 
 Guardian Football
 

1985 births
Living people
Sportspeople from Třebíč
Czech footballers
Czech Republic youth international footballers
Czech Republic under-21 international footballers
Czech First League players
Bohemians 1905 players
FC Vysočina Jihlava players
FK Teplice players
FK Mladá Boleslav players
FC Zbrojovka Brno players
FC Oberlausitz Neugersdorf players
FC Silon Táborsko players
Expatriate footballers in India
Expatriate footballers in Germany
Mumbai City FC players
Indian Super League players
Association football midfielders
Czech expatriate sportspeople in India